Rafflesia gadutensis is a parasitic plant species of the genus Rafflesia. It is native to the Indonesian island of Sumatra. R. gadutensis was named after the place where it was first collected, Ulu Gadut, in West Sumatra.

References

External links
 Parasitic Plant Connection: Rafflesia gadutensis page

gadutensis
Endemic flora of Sumatra